Émile-Robert Blanchet (17 July 1877 in Lausanne, Switzerland – 27 March 1943 in Pully, Switzerland) was a French-speaking Swiss pianist, composer and mountaineer.

Life 
He was taught by his father, the organist of a cathedral in Lausanne, Charles Blanchet, a pupil of Ignaz Moscheles, and Hauptmann. Later he attended Cologne Conservatory and was a pupil of Busoni in Weimar and Berlin. Later he was professor of piano 1904-1917, then director 1905-1908 of the Lausanne Conservatory. He continued teaching there until 1917.

In 1917 he resigned and spent time on climbing on which he would write 2 books. He composed a lot of pieces, especially for piano.

Recordings
 On Kaleidoscope Marc-André Hamelin

There is a CD at this address where a piece of his is recorded.

References

External links
 Émile Robert Blanchet
 
 List of compositions
 A biography about him

Swiss pianists
Swiss composers
Swiss male composers
People from Lausanne
1877 births
1943 deaths
Male pianists
Academic staff of Lausanne Conservatory